SG Wannabe by SG Wannabe 7 Part.II is the second part of the seventh Korean studio album by SG Wannabe. IS Entermedia will be releasing 10,000 copies of a limited edition. SG Wannabe's representative said, "3 out of the 6 songs listed in the album were in competition to be the title song. These are "Song to Confess to You", "If We Can Love Again", and "Just." The songs will only be performed at SG Wannabe's concerts.

Music videos
The music video for "Just", was released on March 18, 2011 and features the three members.

Track listing

References

External links
 

SG Wannabe albums
2011 albums